William Barnes (born 16 March 1939) is a Scottish former professional footballer who played as a full back. Active primarily in England, Barnes made over 100 appearances in the Football League.

Career
Born in Dumbarton, Barnes began his career with Rutherglen Glencairn. He signed professional terms with Bradford City in 1958, and made 59 league appearances between then and 1961. Barnes then played non-league football with Scarborough, before rejoining league football in 1966 with Bradford Park Avenue. After leaving Park Avenue in 1968, Barnes played non-league football with Arnold.

References

External links

1939 births
Living people
Scottish footballers
Sportspeople from Dumbarton
Footballers from West Dunbartonshire
Rutherglen Glencairn F.C. players
Bradford City A.F.C. players
Scarborough F.C. players
Bradford (Park Avenue) A.F.C. players
Arnold F.C. players
English Football League players
Association football fullbacks